Josef Weninger (15 May 1886, Salzburg - 28 March 1959, Vienna) was an Austrian anthropologist.

Early life
Josef Weninger was born on 15 May 1886 in Salzburg, Austria.

Career
Weninger taught as a professor at the University of Vienna.

From 1925, Weninger co-edited the journals Volk und Rasse ("Nation and Race") and Zeitschrift für Rassenkunde ("Journal for Racial Studies"). In 1927, he became the director of the Anthropological Institute in Vienna. His assistants were all members of the NSDAP and Weninger hosted their meetings at his home when the party was still illegal in Austria. In 1938, he was dismissed because his wife was "not Aryan", but was still able to deliver numerous "racial expertises" (Rassengutachten) and published several books on racial theories.

In 1945 he was reinstated as director of the Institute, where he worked until 1957. He became a member of the Austrian Academy of Sciences and honorary president of the Anthropological Society of Vienna and the Association for European Ethnology of Vienna.

Death
Weninger died on 28 March 1959 in Vienna.

Bibliography
 Ernst Klee: Das Personenlexikon zum Dritten Reich. Wer war was vor und nach 1945 (Frankfurt, Fischer 2003), .

1886 births
1959 deaths
Academic staff of the University of Vienna
Austrian anthropologists
Members of the Austrian Academy of Sciences
20th-century anthropologists